Quaoar (minor-planet designation 50000 Quaoar, provisional designation ) is a planet in the Kuiper belt, a region of icy planetesimals beyond Neptune. The object was discovered by American astronomers Chad Trujillo and Michael Brown at the Palomar Observatory on 4 June 2002. Signs of water ice on the surface of Quaoar have been found, which suggests that cryovolcanism may be occurring on Quaoar. A small amount of methane is present on its surface, which can only be retained by the largest Kuiper belt objects. 

Quaoar has one known moon, Weywot, which was discovered by Brown in February 2007. Both objects were named after mythological figures from the Native American Tongva people in Southern California. Quaoar is the Tongva creator deity and Weywot is his son. In February 2023, astronomers announced the discovery of a ring around Quaoar at over twice the Roche limit, which defies theoretical expectations. but that ring system is impossible.

History

Discovery 

Quaoar was discovered on 4 June 2002 by American astronomers Chad Trujillo and Michael Brown at the Palomar Observatory in the Palomar Mountain Range in San Diego County, California. The discovery formed part of the Caltech Wide Area Sky Survey, which was designed to search for the brightest Kuiper belt objects using the Palomar Observatory's 1.22-meter Samuel Oschin telescope. Quaoar was first identified in images by Trujillo on 5 June 2002, when he noticed a dim, 18.6-magnitude object slowly moving among the stars of the constellation Ophiuchus. Quaoar appeared relatively bright for a distant object, suggesting that it could have a size comparable to the diameter of the dwarf planet Pluto.

To ascertain Quaoar's orbit, Brown and Trujillo initiated a search for archival precovery images. They obtained several precovery images taken by the Near-Earth Asteroid Tracking survey from various observatories in 1996 and 2000–2002. In particular, they had also found two archival photographic plates taken by astronomer Charles T. Kowal in May 1983, who at the time was searching for the hypothesized Planet X at the Palomar Observatory. From these precovery images, Brown and Trujillo were able to calculate Quaoar's orbit and distance. Additional precovery images of Quaoar have been later identified, with the earliest known found by Edward Rhoads on a photographic plate imaged on 25 May 1954 from the Palomar Observatory Sky Survey.

Before announcing the discovery of Quaoar, Brown had planned to conduct follow-up observations using the Hubble Space Telescope to measure Quaoar's size. He had also planned to announce the discovery as soon as possible and found it necessary to keep the discovery information confidential during the follow-up observations. Rather than submitting his Hubble proposal under peer review, Brown submitted his proposal directly to one of Hubble's operators, who promptly allocated time to Brown. While setting up the observing algorithm for Hubble, Brown had also planned to use one of the Keck telescopes in Mauna Kea, Hawaii, as a part of a study on cryovolcanism on the moons of Uranus. This provided him additional time for follow-up observations and took advantage of the whole observing session in July to analyze Quaoar's spectrum and characterize its surface composition.

The discovery of Quaoar was formally announced by the Minor Planet Center in a Minor Planet Electronic Circular on 7 October 2002. It was given the provisional designation , indicating that its discovery took place during the first half of June 2002. Quaoar was the 1,512th object discovered in the first half of June, as indicated by the preceding letter and numbers in its provisional designation. On that same day, Trujillo and Brown reported their scientific results from observations of Quaoar at the 34th annual meeting of the American Astronomical Society's Division for Planetary Sciences in Birmingham, Alabama. Quaoar's discovery has been cited by Brown as having contributed to the reclassification of Pluto as a dwarf planet.

Name and symbol 
Upon Quaoar's discovery, it was initially given the temporary nickname "Object X" as a reference to Planet X, due to its potentially large size and unknown nature. At the time, Quaoar's size was uncertain, and its high brightness led the discovery team to speculate that it may be a possible tenth planet. After measuring Quaoar's size with the Hubble Space Telescope in July, the team began considering names for the object, particularly those from local Native American mythologies. Following the International Astronomical Union's (IAU) naming convention for minor planets, non-resonant Kuiper belt objects are to be named after creation deities. The team settled on the name Kwawar, the creator god of the Tongva people indigenous to the Los Angeles Basin, where Brown's institute, the California Institute of Technology, was located.

According to Brown, the name "Quaoar" is pronounced with three syllables, and Trujillo's website on Quaoar gives a three-syllable pronunciation, as an approximation of the Tongva pronunciation . The name can be also pronounced as two syllables, reflecting the usual English spelling and pronunciation of the deity Kwawar.

In Tongva mythology, Kwawar is the genderless creation force of the universe, singing and dancing deities into existence. He first sings and dances to create Weywot (Sky Father), then they together sing Chehooit (Earth Mother) and Tamit (Grandfather Sun) into existence. As they did this, the creation force became more complex as each new deity joined the singing and dancing. Eventually, after reducing chaos to order, they created the seven great giants that upheld the world, then the animals and finally the first man and woman, Tobohar and Pahavit.

Upon their investigation of names from Tongva mythology, Brown and Trujillo realized that there were contemporary members of the Tongva people, whom they contacted for permission to use the name. They consulted tribal historian Marc Acuña, who confirmed that the name Kwawar would indeed be an appropriate name for the newly discovered object. However, the Tongva preferred the spelling Qua-o-ar, which Brown and Trujillo adopted, though with the hyphens omitted. The name and discovery of Quaoar were publicly announced in October, though Brown had not sought approval of the name by the IAU's Committee on Small Body Nomenclature (CSBN). Indeed, Quaoar's name was announced before the official numbering of the object, which Brian Marsden—the head of the Minor Planet Center—remarked in 2004 to be a violation of the protocol. Despite this, the name was approved by the CSBN, and the naming citation, along with Quaoar's official numbering, was published in a Minor Planet Circular on 20 November 2002.

Quaoar was given the minor planet number 50000, which was not by coincidence but to commemorate its large size, being that it was found in the search for a Pluto-sized object in the Kuiper belt. The large Kuiper belt object 20000 Varuna was similarly numbered for a similar occasion. However, subsequent even larger discoveries such as 136199 Eris were simply numbered according to the order in which their orbits were confirmed.

Planetary symbols are no longer much used in astronomy, so Quaoar never received a symbol in the astronomical literature. A Quaoar symbol, mostly used among astrologers, is included in Unicode as U+1F77E. The symbol was designed by Denis Moskowitz, a software engineer in Massachusetts; it combines the letter Q (for 'Quaoar') with a canoe, and is stylized to recall angular Tongva rock art.

Orbit and classification 

With an orbital eccentricity of 0.04, Quaoar follows a nearly circular orbit, only slightly varying in distance from 42 AU at perihelion to 45 AU at aphelion. At such distances, light from the Sun takes more than 5 hours to reach Quaoar. Quaoar will reach perihelion around February 2075.

Because Quaoar has a nearly circular orbit, it does not approach close to Neptune such that its orbit can become significantly perturbed under the gravitational influence of Neptune. Quaoar's minimum orbit intersection distance from Neptune is only 12.3 AU—it does not approach Neptune within this distance over the course of its orbit, as it is not in a mean-motion orbital resonance with Neptune. Simulations by the Deep Ecliptic Survey show that the perihelion and aphelion distances of Quaoar's orbit do not change significantly over the next 10 million years; Quaoar's orbit appears to be stable over the long term.

Quaoar is generally classified as a trans-Neptunian object or distant minor planet by the Minor Planet Center since it orbits in the outer Solar System beyond Neptune. Since Quaoar is not in a mean-motion resonance with Neptune, it is also classified as a classical Kuiper belt object (cubewano) by the Minor Planet Center and Deep Ecliptic Survey. Quaoar's orbit is moderately inclined to the ecliptic plane by 8 degrees, relatively high when compared to the inclinations of Kuiper belt objects within the dynamically cold population. Because Quaoar's orbital inclination is greater than 4 degrees, it is part of the dynamically hot population of high-inclination classical Kuiper belt objects. The high inclinations of hot classical Kuiper belt objects such as Quaoar are thought to have resulted from gravitational scattering by Neptune during its outward migration in the early Solar System.

Physical characteristics 

Quaoar's albedo or reflectivity could be as low as 0.1, similar to 's albedo of 0.127. This may indicate that fresh ice has disappeared from Quaoar's surface. The surface is moderately red, meaning that Quaoar is relatively more reflective in the red and near-infrared spectrum than in the blue. Larger Kuiper belt objects are often much brighter because they are covered in more fresh ice and have a higher albedo, and thus they present a neutral color. A 2006 model of internal heating via radioactive decay suggested that Quaoar may not be capable of sustaining an internal ocean of liquid water at the mantle–core boundary.

The presence of methane and other volatiles on Quaoar's surface suggest that it may support a tenuous atmosphere produced from the sublimation of volatiles. With a measured mean temperature of ~ , the upper limit of Quaoar's atmospheric pressure is expected to be in the range of a few microbars. Due to Quaoar's small size and mass, the possibility of Quaoar having an atmosphere of nitrogen and carbon monoxide has been ruled out, since the gases would escape from Quaoar. The upper limit of atmosphere pressure was tightened to 10 nanobars after another stellar occultation in 2019.

Mass and density 
Because Quaoar is a binary object, the mass of the system can be calculated from the orbit of the secondary. Light-curve-amplitude analysis shows only small deviations, suggesting that Quaoar is indeed a spheroid with small albedo spots and hence a dwarf planet.

Planetary scientist Erik Asphaug has suggested that Quaoar may have collided with a much larger body, stripping the lower-density mantle from Quaoar, and leaving behind the denser core. He envisioned that Quaoar was originally covered by a mantle of ice that made it  to  bigger than its present size, and that it collided with another Kuiper belt object about twice its size—an object roughly the diameter of Pluto, or even approaching the size of Mars. This model was made assuming Quaoar actually had a density of 4.2 g/cm3, but more recent estimates have given it a more Pluto-like density of only 2 g/cm3, with no further need for the collision theory.

Size 

The estimates come from observations of stellar occultations by Quaoar, in which it passes in front of a star, in 2013 and 2019. Quaoar is about as large and massive as (if somewhat smaller than) Pluto's moon Charon. Quaoar is roughly half the size of Pluto.

Quaoar was the first trans-Neptunian object to be measured directly from Hubble Space Telescope images, using a method comparing images with the Hubble point spread function (PSF). Given its distance Quaoar is on the limit of Hubble's resolution of 40 milliarcseconds and its image is consequently "smeared" on a few adjacent pixels. By comparing carefully this image with the images of stars in the background and using a sophisticated model of Hubble optics (PSF), Brown and Trujillo were able to find the best-fit disk size that would give a similar blurred image. This method was also applied by the same authors to measure the size of the dwarf planet Eris.

At the time of its discovery in 2002, Quaoar was the largest object found in the Solar System since the discovery of Pluto. Quaoar's size was subsequently revised downward and was later superseded in size as larger objects (and ) were discovered. The uncorrected 2004 Hubble estimates only marginally agree with the 2007 infrared measurements by the Spitzer Space Telescope that suggest a higher albedo (0.19) and consequently a smaller diameter. Adopting a Uranian satellite limb darkening profile suggests that the 2004 Hubble size estimate for Quaoar was approximately 40 percent too large, and that a more proper estimate would be about 900 km. In observations of the object's shadow as it occulted an unnamed 16th-magnitude star on 4 May 2011, Quaoar was estimated to be  in diameter.

Rotation and shape 
Rotational light curves of Quaoar observed on March through June 2003 gave two possible rotation periods: 8.64 hours for a single-peaked light curve by a spheroidal body, or 17.68 hours for a double-peaked light curve by an elongated ellipsoidal body. The discovery of Quaoar's ring in 2023 showed that its true rotation period should most likely be 17.68 hours in order to explain the ring's location with a stable 1:3 spin-orbit resonance. This in turn implies Quaoar should be somewhat elongated to induce such a resonance; hints of Quaoar's ellipticity have been detected in multiple occultation observations, but remain yet to be analyzed in detail.

Cryovolcanism 
In 2004, signs of crystalline ice were found on Quaoar, indicating that the temperature rose to at least  sometime in the last ten million years. Some have theorized that a barrage of mini-meteors may have raised the temperature, but the most discussed theory speculates that cryovolcanism may be occurring, spurred by the decay of radioactive elements within Quaoar's core. More precise observations of Quaoar's near infrared spectrum in 2007 indicated the presence of small quantities (5%) of solid methane and ethane. Both models and observations suggest that only a few larger bodies (Pluto,  and ) can retain the volatile ices whereas the dominant population of small trans-Neptunian objects lost them. Quaoar, with only small amounts of methane, appears to be in an intermediary category.

Ring 

Quaoar is the third small Solar System body known and confirmed to have a ring system, after 10199 Chariklo and 136108 Haumea. A partly dense, mostly tenuous and uniquely distant ring was first recognised and reported by Australian astronomers soon after observing a stellar occultation in August 2021. Its landmark dense and narrow section was discovered by Jonathan Bradshaw, Renato Langersek and John Broughton, but many non detections revealed its largely tenuous nature. Scientists gained additional detections from subtle dimmings in a few earlier lightcurves and announced the discovery in February 2023. 

The irregular width of Quaoar's ring resembles Saturn's F ring, which may imply the presence of small, kilometer-sized moonlets embedded within the ring and gravitationally perturbing the material. Quaoar's ring likely consists of icy particles that elastically collide with each other without accreting into a larger mass.

The ring's coincidental location at these resonances implies they play a key role in maintaining the ring without having it accrete into a single moon. In particular, the confinement of rings to the 1:3 spin-orbit resonance may be common among ringed small Solar System bodies, as it has been previously seen in Chariklo and Haumea.

Satellite 

Quaoar has one known moon, Weywot (full designation (50000) Quaoar I Weywot), discovered in 2006 and named after the sky god Weywot, son of Quaoar.

Exploration 

It has been calculated that a flyby mission to Quaoar using a Jupiter gravity assist would take 13.6 years, for launch dates of 25 December 2016, 22 November 2027, 22 December 2028, 22 January 2030 and 20 December 2040. Quaoar would be 41 to 43 AU from the Sun when the spacecraft arrived. In July 2016, the Long Range Reconnaissance Imager (LORRI) aboard the New Horizons spacecraft took a sequence of four images of Quaoar from a distance of about 14 AU. Interstellar Probe, a concept by Pontus Brandt and his colleagues at Johns Hopkins Applied Physics Laboratory would potentially fly by Quaoar in the 2030s before continuing to the interstellar medium, and the first of China National Space Administration's proposed Interstellar Express probe designed to explore the heliosphere has it considered as a potential flyby target. Quaoar has been chosen as a flyby target for missions like these particularly for its escaping methane atmosphere and possible cryovolcanism, as well as its close proximity to the heliospheric nose.

Notes

References

External links 

 Frequently Asked Questions About Quaoar 
 Quaoar could have hit a bigger Pluto-sized body at high speeds (Video Credit: Craig Agnor, E. Asphaug)
 Chilly Quaoar had a warmer past – Nature.com article
 Quaoar: Planetoid Beyond Pluto – SPACE.com article by Elizabeth Howell
 Beyond Jupiter – (50000) Quaoar
 
 

050000
Discoveries by Michael E. Brown
Discoveries by Chad Trujillo
Named minor planets
 
Dwarf planets
Binary trans-Neptunian objects
050000
20020604